John Leighton Davies (24 August 1927  – April 1995) was a Welsh rugby union, and professional rugby league footballer who played in the 1940s and 1950s.

Background
John Leighton Davies was born in Skewen (his birth was registered in Swansea), Wales.

After retirement, he became a patron of Wakefield RFC, and was an active supporter of the club until his death.

He was also heavily responsible for Wakefield RFC’s 'Salute to Rugby'
book a compilation of "favourite recipes from famous people" including Prince Charles and the then Prime Minister Margaret Thatcher, which was published in 1980 in support of Wakefield Rugby Football Club.

An acknowledgment in the book reads “J Leighton Davies, for his superhuman efforts in compiling all the recipes”.

He was the father in law of former Wakefield RFC captain Martin Shuttleworth, and grandfather of Otley's Iain Shuttleworth.

He died aged 67–68 in Wakefield, West Yorkshire, England.

Playing career
John Leighton Davies made his début for Wakefield Trinity during October 1948, he appears to have scored no drop-goals (or field-goals as they are currently known in Australasia), but prior to the 1974–75 season all goals, whether; conversions, penalties, or drop-goals, scored 2-points, consequently prior to this date drop-goals were often not explicitly documented, therefore '0' drop-goals may indicate drop-goals not recorded, rather than no drop-goals scored. In addition, prior to the 1949–50 season, the archaic field-goal was also still a valid means of scoring points.

Contemporaneous Article Extract
"Born in Skewen, South Wales, gained international schoolboy honours at Neath Technical. Played for Neath R.U., and had represented Glamorgan County on six occasions to reach the verge of international honours before turning to R.L. in October 1948. Looked set for an illustrious professional career when a succession of knee injuries forced his premature retirement in 1952."

Genealogical information
John Leighton Davies' marriage to Dorothy E. (née Banham) was registered during second ¼ 1950 in Wakefield district.

References

External links

Search for "John Davies" at rugbyleagueproject.org

1927 births
1995 deaths
Footballers who switched code
Glamorgan County RFC players
Neath RFC players
Rugby league centres
Rugby league players from Neath Port Talbot
Rugby union players from Skewen
Wakefield RFC
Wakefield Trinity players
Welsh rugby league players
Welsh rugby union players